The 2018 U.S. prison strike was a series of work stoppages and hunger strikes in prisons across the United States that began on August 21 and ended on September 9. The strike was conducted at least in part in response to the April 2018 prison riot at Lee Correctional Institution, which killed seven inmates and was the deadliest prison riot in the U.S. in the past 25 years.

The start and end dates of the strike have symbolic meaning as they were planned to coincide with the 47th anniversary of the death of George Jackson, who was shot in an escape attempt on August 21, 1971, and the Attica Prison riot, which occurred on September 9, 1971.

It was claimed that suspected strike participants and leaders were punished with solitary confinement, removing communication privileges, and prison transfers.

Organizers 
The prison strike was called for and organized primarily by Jailhouse Lawyers Speak and Incarcerated Workers Organizing Committee, which is a prisoner-lead section of Industrial Workers of the World. Millions for Prisoners and The People's Consortium are some of the other groups involved.

Demands 
The following were the demands of the prison strike according to the official page:

 Immediate improvements to the conditions of prisons and prison policies that recognize the humanity of imprisoned men and women.
 An immediate end to prison slavery. All persons imprisoned in any place of detention under United States jurisdiction must be paid the prevailing wage in their state or territory for their labor.
 The Prison Litigation Reform Act must be rescinded, allowing imprisoned humans a proper channel to address grievances and violations of their rights.
 The Truth in Sentencing Act and the Sentencing Reform Act must be rescinded so that imprisoned humans have a possibility of rehabilitation and parole. No human shall be sentenced to Death by Incarceration or serve any sentence without the possibility of parole.
 An immediate end to the racial overcharging, over-sentencing, and parole denials of Black and brown humans. Black humans shall no longer be denied parole because the victim of the crime was white, which is a particular problem in southern states.
 An immediate end to racist gang enhancement laws targeting Black and brown humans.
 No imprisoned human shall be denied access to rehabilitation programs at their place of detention because of their label as a violent offender.
 State prisons must be funded specifically to offer more rehabilitation services.
 Pell grants must be reinstated in all US states and territories.
 The voting rights of all confined citizens serving prison sentences, pretrial detainees, and so-called “ex-felons” must be counted. Representation is demanded. All voices count.

Timeline

Pre-Emptive censorship & repression (June - July 2018)
 
Ronald Brooks was transferred from Angola Prison to the David Wade Correctional Center in late June 2018 after he made a pro-strike video.

In late July, Siddique Hassan was reported for five violations of prison rules, including “Rioting, or encouraging others to riot”. This was most likely a way to prevent him from speaking to the media during the strike as he had during the 2016 Prison Strike.

Strike activity begins early (August 2018)

On August 9th, the first confirmed strike activity began at the GEO Group prison in response to administration cutting family visits, harassing families, strip searching elder family members, and STIU targeting, harassing, and abusing inmates. Three housing units joined in the work stoppage. In response, New Mexico prison officials put all state prisons on lockdown on August 20th as a preemptive measure.

On August 19th, prisoners in the Burnside jail in Nova Scotia, Canada held a protest and released a statement in support of the strike and with their own list of demands.

Strike begins
While most news on strike activity didn't reach the outside on the first day, the strike received widespread attention from numerous news outlets including USA Today, Newsweek and National Public Radio.

At least 200 detained immigrants at the Northwest Detention Center in Tacoma, Washington engaged in a hunger strike and/or work stoppage, releasing a statement stating that they are
"acting with solidarity for all those people who are being detained wrongfully, and stand together to help support all those women who have been separated from their children, and to stop all the family separations happening today for a lot of us are also being separated and we have U.S. citizen children.”

Heriberto Sharky Garcia, incarcerated in Folsom, California, declared a hunger strike.

There were also unconfirmed reports of 11 out of 143 prisons in Florida being affected, although the Florida Department of Corrections claimed that they had no stoppages, protests, or lockdowns related to the strike.

Alleged retaliation
It was claimed by strike participants and their families that suspected strike participants and leaders/organizers were punished with solitary confinement, removing communication privileges, and prison transfers.

See also 
 2010 Georgia prison strike
2016 U.S. prison strike
Incarceration in the United States
 Prison strike
 Prisoners' rights

References 

Penal labor in the United States
Penal system in the United States
Unfree labor in the United States
Labor disputes in the United States
August 2018 events in the United States
2018 labor disputes and strikes
Prison strikes